Rößler is a surname and may refer to:
 Hole Rößler (born 1949), German modern pentathlete
 Matthias Rößler (born 1955), German politician (CDU)
 Robert Rößler (1838–1883), German poet
 Rößler firearms, an Austrian firearms manufacturer

See also
 Rössler
 Roessler
 Roeseler